Jocelyn Benedict Laurence Cadbury  (3 March 1946 – 31 July 1982) was a British Conservative Party politician.

Early life and education
Jocelyn Cadbury was born in 1946, the son of Laurence Cadbury and Joyce née Mathews, and the younger brother of Sir Adrian Cadbury and Sir Dominic Cadbury. He was educated at Eton College and Trinity College, Cambridge, where he graduated with a degree in Economics and Anthropology. Alongside his academic studies, he was a keen rower.

In 1970, he began working at Lucas Industries in Birmingham, as an industrial relations officer. From 1974, he worked for Cadbury.

Political career
At the 1979 general election, on his second attempt, Cadbury was elected Member of Parliament for Birmingham Northfield, defeating Labour incumbent Raymond Carter. It was one of the Conservatives' best and most surprising results in that election, as a Labour majority of 10,597 was overturned into a Conservative one of 204 on a 10.2% swing.

Cadbury argued for an alternative economic strategy to help the manufacturing industry. Together with other Conservative MPs, he supported a September 1981 pamphlet called "Changing Gear", which criticised the government's economic approach.

In November 1981, Cadbury was appointed as Parliamentary Private Secretary to the Minister of State for Industry, Norman Lamont.

Death
On 31 July 1982, Cadbury committed suicide, shooting himself in the garden of his parents' home in Birmingham. He was 36.

References 

 Times Guide to the House of Commons, 1979
 The Almanac of British Politics (1999)

External links
 

1946 births
1982 suicides
Alumni of Trinity College, Cambridge
British politicians who committed suicide
Cadbury
Conservative Party (UK) MPs for English constituencies
Members of the Bow Group
People educated at Eton College
Suicides by firearm in England
UK MPs 1979–1983